Sheldon Howard Harris (August 22, 1928 – August 31, 2002) was a historian and Professor Emeritus of History at California State University, Northridge.

Biography
Harris was born in Brooklyn.
A professor of History at California State University, Northridge, in 1984 he became involved in research on Japanese biological warfare experimentation in Manchuria. His research led him to deliver several papers to international conferences on science and ethics and to the publication of a number of scholarly articles that aroused considerable interest in the United States, Europe, Japan and China.  He published six books and dozens of articles. In 1994, he published Factories of Death: Japanese Biological Warfare, 1932 – 1945, and the American Cover-Up.

He was educated at Brooklyn College, Harvard University, and Columbia University.

References

External links
 Sheldon H. Harris papers at the Hoover Institution Archives

See also
Biological warfare

1928 births
2002 deaths
20th-century American educators
20th-century American historians
American male non-fiction writers
California State University, Northridge faculty
Jewish American writers
People from Brooklyn
Harvard University alumni
Historians from New York (state)
Brooklyn College alumni
Historians from California
20th-century American male writers
20th-century American Jews
21st-century American Jews